Sheikh Pur is a village located in the eastern part of Gujrat District in Pakistan. The village is situated at the banks of the Chenab river.

The village has a telephone exchange, police station, a high school for boys & girls.
The village have a big festival (Mela)  Hazrat Hafiz Mian Muhammad Pahan saab (Shrine)in 28–29 March.

Populated places in Gujrat District